Mouzinho Barreto de Lima (born 26 February 2002) is an East Timorese professional footballer who plays as a forward for Visakha in the Cambodian Premier League and Timor-Leste national team. In 2022 he played for Angkor Tiger in the same league as well.

He is considered one of the most promising footballers of East Timor as well as in all of Southeast Asia. He was one of the top scorers of the 2019 AFF U-18 Youth Championship with 6 goals, alongside Australia's Dylan Ruiz-Diaz and Indonesia's Bagus Kahfi.

Career

Born in Maliana, Mouzinho is the youngest of six siblings, a devout Catholic and very close to his family. Inspired by Cristiano Ronaldo while growing up, the Timorese sensation aimed to emulate the Portuguese icon and set out to become the best player in Asia.

In 2020, Mouzinho was the top scorer of the Copa FFTL, scoring 14 goals in 7 matches. 

Mouzinho was first scouted by Angkor Tiger Head Coach Alistair Heath after coming across the forward’s exploits during the 2022 AFF U-23 Championship and the 2021 SEA Games. Not long after, the Timorese forward then signed for the Cambodian Premier League outfit on June 1st 2022 and introduced himself to the Cambodian football fraternity by scoring for Timor-Leste against the Cambodia national football team in a friendly game one day later. The strike marked Mouzinho’s first goal for his national team but his side would eventually suffer a 2-1 defeat. 

Mouzinho made his debut for the Cambodian Tigers on July 2nd in a 3-3 draw against Kirivong Sok Sen Chey and would come off the bench against Phnom Penh Crown in the subsequent game. After showing his flair and professionalism in Round 2, Mouzinho’s efforts were rewarded at the start of Round 3 when he bagged a brace in a match against Visakha. The following match against Kirivong, Mouzinho made his first assist to Iago Bento.

Career statistics

International

Individual
 AFF U-19 Youth Championship Top scorer: 2019

References

External links
 

2002 births
Living people
East Timorese footballers
Timor-Leste international footballers
People from Bobonaro District
Association football forwards
Competitors at the 2021 Southeast Asian Games
Expatriate footballers in Cambodia
Angkor Tiger FC players
Southeast Asian Games competitors for East Timor